Jawali is a town in Kangra District of Himachal Pradesh State in India.Old name of Jawali is Jawanwalashehar. Jawali is the second largest Assembly constituency in the state of Himachal Pradesh. It is located 250 km distance from its State Capital, Shimla and is located 50 km distance from its District headquarters Dharamshala.

Geography 
Jawali Town is situated in District Kangra, Himachal Pradesh, India, its geographical coordinates is 32° 9' 0" North, 76° 1' 0" East and its original name (with diacritics) is Jawāli.  .There is a Fort of a King which is situated near bus stand of Jawali also there is a historic temple, now a tourist place named Bathu Temples/ Bathu Ki Ladee which is located inside the reservoir area of Maharana Pratap Sagar(Pong Dam), constructed on river Beas, which makes it accessible only for a few months when the water level drops.

Transport 
Jawali Town is reached by Gaggal Airport (IATA airport code DHM) about 28.8 km / 17.9 miles and 37.2 km / 23.1 miles. The town is also reached by Kangra Valley Railway line from Pathankot 45 km (28 miles) away named Jawanwala Shehar.

List of all towns and Villages

Nearby cities with distances 
Nurpur town, Himachal Pradesh -30 km
Chandigarh – 240 km
Palampur – 79 km
Dhan – 2 km
Joginder Nagar – 116 km
Pathankot – 46 km
Dharamshala – 52 km
Dalhousie – 90 km
Kangra – 50 km
Nagrota Surian – 30 km
Dehra – 65 km
Shimla – 250 km
Fatehpur (Vidhan Sabha constituency) – 15 km

Temples
Vaishno Devi Mandir is situated in Dhan, approximately 2 kilometres from Jawali. This is one of the famous Hindu temple in Jawali. It is situated 2 km away from Jawali near Dhan village. we have to go either by walk or by Bus.  Nearest railway station from dhan village is Jawanwala shehar.google view
Mata Mansa Devi Mandir in Jawali.

Villages in Kangra district